State Route 128 (SR 128) is a state highway in western and western Middle Tennessee.

It connects Pickwick Dam with Linden, via Savannah and Clifton.

Route description

Hardin County

SR 128 begins as a primary highway in Hardin County in the community of Pickwick Dam at an intersection with SR 57, just north of the Mississippi state line. The highway then goes north and crosses overtop of Pickwick Landing Dam, which impounds the Tennessee River, before leaving Pickwick Dam and continuing north through rural areas. It then passes through the communities of Nixon, where it has an intersection with SR 226, and Walkertown before entering the city of Savannah and coming to an intersection and becoming concurrent with US 64/SR 15/SR 69 in downtown. The highway then turns west and immediately comes to an intersection where SR 69 splits off and goes south. They then leave downtown and pass through a major business district and several neighborhoods before leaving Savannah and continuing east through rural areas, right after having another intersection with SR 226 and widening to a 4-lane divided highway. SR 128 then splits off from US 64/SR 15 and goes north again shortly afterwards and travels through mostly wooded areas for the next several miles, where it passes through the community of Crossroads. SR 128 then comes to an intersection and becomes concurrent with US 641/SR 114, where it becomes a secondary highway shortly before crossing into Wayne County.

Wayne County

US 641/SR 114/SR 128 parallel the Tennessee River as they enter the town of Clifton, where SR 128 splits from US 641/SR 114 to pass through downtown. SR 128 then turns north again to leave Clifton just shortly before having an intersection with SR 228. SR 128 then enters rural areas as it crosses into Perry County.

Throughout the entire concurrency with US 641/SR 114 and up to the intersection with SR 228, SR 128 is signed as an east-west highway.

Perry County

The highway then becomes curvy as it enters some mountains and wooded areas. It continues winding its way through the mountains for several miles before coming to an end at an intersection with SR 13 just south of Linden.

Major intersections

References

128
Transportation in Hardin County, Tennessee
Transportation in Wayne County, Tennessee
Transportation in Perry County, Tennessee